'Lab Lemco' Powder  is a refined meat extract that is very light in color and has been in production since 1865.  This product is used in a wide range of bacteriological growth media. It has growth-promoting qualities for the culturing of cells in laboratories, and is much easier to handle than most other meat extracts. 

Lemco refers to the original producer of the meat extract, the Liebig's Extract of Meat Company.

References

Microbiological media ingredients
Bacteriology